Hugh McDermott may refer to:

 Hugh McDermott (basketball) (1893–1978), head basketball coach at the University of Oklahoma, 1922–1938
 Hugh McDermott (actor) (1906–1972), British actor
 Hugh McDermott (politician) (born 1968), Australian politician
 Hugh Joseph McDermott, engineer